Good Hope is a village in the Good Hope District of Botswana.  Originally called Gamokoto village, now a ward in Good Hope.The village is the capital of Barolong who are one of the major tribes in Botswana. It serves as the administrative center for the Good Hope District Council.

It is home to the Barolong farms, known for its large commercial arable fields. Barolong are ruled by Chief Lotlamoreng II Montshioa. The Barolong of the Tshidi.

Geography 
Good Hope is located in the Good Hope  District of Botswana.

Good Hope has a Prmary Hospital,a Land Board ( Rolong Land Board) a Clinic, a Junior Secondary School, one of the biggest Primary Schools in Botswana and a Police Station among the many government institutions. It is also home to the largest Senior School by capacity opened March 2008.

Good Hope is approximately 48 km  from Lobatse which is the nearest town serving all villages with banking services , shopping malls and other amenities that may not be available in their area villages. Good Hope is approximately 115 km from Gaborone, the capital city of Botswana. Mahikeng is another nearby town across border approximately 50 km from Good Hope. Mahikeng  is in the North West Province of South Africa. A historic town of Barolong who span across Botswana and South Africa. During the era of Bophuthatswana before South Africa gained independence, Mahikeng used to serve Barolong  with amenities not available in Botswana, people used to come as far as Gaborone for a shopping experience in Mahikeng.

Population 
The population was 6,362 in 2011 census.

Government 
Good Hope is under the Good Hope-Mabule Constituency  represented by MP Eric Molale in the National Assembly.

References

Southern District (Botswana)
Villages in Botswana